Mystical Adventures is an album by French jazz fusion artist Jean-Luc Ponty, released in 1982.

Track listing 
All songs by Jean-Luc Ponty unless otherwise noted.
"Mystical Adventures (Suite) Part I" – 3:29
"Mystical Adventures (Suite) Part II" – 3:36 
"Mystical Adventures (Suite) Part III" – 7:29 
"Mystical Adventures (Suite) Part IV" – 0:47 
"Mystical Adventures (Suite) Part V" – 5:04 
"Rhythms of Hope" – 4:02 
"As" (Stevie Wonder, arranged by Jean-Luc Ponty) – 5:48 
"Final Truth - Part I" – 4:54
"Final Truth - Part II" – 2:06
"Jig" – 3:56

Personnel 
 Jean-Luc Ponty – acoustic & electric violins; Yamaha electric piano (tracks 1, 4); Yamaha organ (tracks 2-6, 9, 10); synthesizer (tracks 1, 3, 5, 9); vocoder (tracks 3, 7); voice (track 3)
 Chris Rhyne – grand piano (tracks 2, 5, 8); Fender Rhodes electric piano (tracks 2, 3, 5-7, 10); Prophet-5 & Oberheim 8-voice synthesizers (tracks 2, 3, 5-10)
 Jamie Glaser – electric guitar (tracks 2, 3, 5-9); acoustic guitar (track 10)
 Randy Jackson – electric bass (tracks 2, 3, 5-10)
 Rayford Griffin – drums (tracks 1-3, 5-10); percussion (track 9); voice (tracks 3, 7)
 Paulinho Da Costa – percussion (tracks 6, 7, 10)

Production
 Producer: Jean-Luc Ponty
 Co-producer: Arif Mardin (track 7)
 Recording engineer: Dee Robb
 Assistant recording engineer: Brad Gilderman
 Overdubs engineers: Bruce Robb, Stuart Graham
 Mixing engineer: Peter R. Kelsey
 Mastered by Bernie Grundman
 Front cover painting by Daved Levitan
 Cover concept by Claudia Ponty
 Back cover photography by Sam Emerson

Recorded at Cherokee Recording Studios, Los Angeles, California, August and September, 1981.

Charts

References

External links 
 Jean-Luc Ponty - Mystical Adventures (1982) album review by Dave Connolly, credits & releases at AllMusic
 Jean-Luc Ponty - Mystical Adventures (1982) album releases & credits at Discogs
 Jean-Luc Ponty - Mystical Adventures (1982) album credits & user reviews at ProgArchives.com
 Jean-Luc Ponty - Mystical Adventures (1982) album to be listened as stream on Spotify

1981 albums
Jean-Luc Ponty albums
Albums produced by Arif Mardin
Atlantic Records albums